Alice Day Pratt was a teacher and author who at age 40 joined the last wave of government-sponsored homesteading in the U.S. state of Oregon. The  parcel of land became hers through provisions of the Enlarged Homestead Act of 1909. Living on her ranch, Broadview, from 1912 through 1930, she kept dogs, cats, horses, chickens, and cows and sometimes produced enough surplus to sell alfalfa, hay, grain, milk, eggs, and vegetables. To supplement her income, she taught school in Post, Prineville, and Conant Basin.

Biography
Born in Minnesota in 1872, Pratt grew up there and in South Dakota, later teaching in the South before moving to Oregon to start a new life. Living at first in a tent, Pratt worked Broadview primarily by herself with occasional help from neighbors and other homesteaders. She wrote about her initial Broadview experience in A Homesteader's Portfolio, first published in 1922. Cold, wind, snow, and drought eventually forced her to sell her dairy herd to repay a loan, and in 1930 she gave up dryland farming and moved east to Niagara Falls, to live with her mother and sister. Later relocating to New York City, she retained possession of Broadview until 1950.

First published by The Macmillan Company, A Homesteader's Portfolio was reprinted by the Oregon State University Press in 1993. Pratt's other work includes Animal Babies and Animals of a Sagebrush Ranch, both for juvenile readers, as well as Three Frontiers, and the Alice Day Pratt Papers, 1960. Unpublished work includes a novel called Sagebrush Fires, several short stories, and Teacher's Trek, a memoir about her teaching experiences.

See also
Julius W. Pratt, Alice Pratt's brother, a noted historian

References

Sources

1872 births
1963 deaths
20th-century American writers
20th-century American women writers
People from Crook County, Oregon
People from Mankato, Minnesota